Kamień is a village in Chełm County, Lublin Voivodeship, in eastern Poland. It is the seat of the gmina (administrative district) called Gmina Kamień.

The village has a population of 870.

References

Villages in Chełm County